Mitromorpha alphonsiana is a species of sea snail, a marine gastropod mollusk in the family Mitromorphidae.

Description
The length of the shell attains 6 mm, its diameter 2.75 mm.

The small shell has a biconic shape and an acuminate apex. The shell has a white color. The middle of the whorls is ornated with white and yellow dots, alternating on the ribs, below two series of granules, cut by subsutural striae. Those two rows of dots on the superior part have a violet-rose color only on the first two whorls. This color nuance changes on the body whorl. Here the two upper rows of dots are white. The shell contains 7–8 whorls, of which 2–3 smooth and milky white whorls in the protoconch. The others are convex with an indistinct suture. The longitudinal ribs are dense and are crossed by two transverse striae on each whorl, subsutarally sulcate and decussate by small lirae. The superior part of the narrow, oblique body whorl is slightly rounded, the inferior part attenuate and elongate. The superior part of the columella is concave, inflated at the middle. The convex outer lip is incrassate and sinuate at the suture and has a sharp margin.

Distribution
This marine species occurs off New Caledonia and the Tuamotu Islands.

References

External links
 MNHN, Paris: Mitromorpha alphonsiana
 
 
  Salvat, Bernard, and Jean Tröndlé. "Biogéographie des mollusques marins de Polynésie française." Revue d’Ecologie (Terre et Vie) 72.3 (2017): 215–257

alphonsiana
Gastropods described in 1899